Kōriyama Station is the name of multiple train stations in Japan:

 Kōriyama Station (Fukushima), JR East station in Koriyama, Fukushima Prefecture
 Kōriyama Station (Nara), JR West station in Yamato-Koriyama, Nara Prefecture
 Kintetsu Kōriyama Station, Kintetsu station in Yamato-Koriyama, Nara Prefecture